Masa is a Japanese musician who was a member of GacktJOB, Gackt's band. He has also been in the disbanded Spiky, Dizzy Drive and Marmarsa☆mu (マァマァサ☆ムゥ).

Biography
Masa was born on the 30th of September in Kyoto, year unknown. He then studied music at a university for three years. He learned the English language while living in New York for four years. A day after he graduated from the university, he returned home.

Being raised in a rather strict family and never really having watched TV in his childhood except for educational programs, he came a long way from the boy listening to Bon Jovi on borrowed cassette tapes and singing covers of Kurt Cobain songs to being the accomplished international musician he was later. After buying his first CD, Metallica's "...Justice For All", it was basically the song "One" which inspired him to play the guitar. He started to learn it with getting lessons from an older friend in the neighbourhood who had a band. He paid for the lessons with working as a roadie for them. In junior high and high school years he formed various bands, playing in sessions at first and later in live houses around the area. Feeling restricted by the rules and regulations of the Japanese school system he decided to go to America.

So, after graduating from Vocational School he went to New York alone. He had no knowledge in English and arrived with just one suitcase and his guitar.
"I was truly starting from nothing but it's from nothing that you can be reborn." he said.
Studying English in language school with fellow students from all over the world, he went from the lowest to the highest level in three months only. To attend the university he wanted, he needed a score of at least 550 in the TOEFL exam. After only getting about 300 on first try, he went back to studying for another ten months and finally reached his goal. He went to the Parsons School of Design to study music, art, English and more. There he became an excellent guitarist, being able to play all kinds of different styles like classical, jazz or rock. He was also able to play in many sessions there with all kinds of musicians, enjoying the more flexible and independent ways of the music business in America.

After four years of studying and living in New york he returned to Japan one day after graduation and only one week later was hired by Yusuke Asada (U-SKE Asada), a famous producer and artist who has performed with major label groups like Chara, produced video game and movie soundtracks and major artists like Crystal Kay. He says about this time that it was his true beginning as a musician. During this time he also met Gackt who asked him to play as a guitarist in GacktJob for his Mars Tour in 2000. He continued his work there until spring 2002 when he decided to go independent and start his solo career as the front man in the band Spiky.
"I wanted to be able to grow as a composer in my own right, as well as being able to write lyrics and become a vocalist." he said.
They toured Japan and released eleven CDs until he left in the end of 2004. They held two final concerts in 2006 before officially disbanding.

In the beginning of 2005 masa then formed his very own band, DIZZY DRIVE, touring Japan and releasing a couple of demo CDs and one CD album. In 2006 he felt it's time for evolution and radically changed the image and musical style of the band. 
With the members still staying the same more or less, the band name was changed to マァマァサ☆ムゥ. Sadly, just after having achieved national recognition and getting ready to a tour of Japan in February 2007, their activities came to a screeching halt when masa was involved in a near fatal traffic accident. After a long recovery time he resumed his work and returned on stage in October of the same year. After some concerts, demo CDs and even a TV appearance masa finally decided to take a break for an indefinite period of time and so マァマァサ☆ムゥ disbanded in March 2008.
He also played in various session lives covering Buck-Tick and LunaSea songs among others.

- Credits: Various sources online and the article about masa in the first issue of Five For magazine (December 2007) which also features an interview with him.]

GacktJOB, Spiky, Dizzy Drive and マァマァサ☆ムゥ
Masa worked with Yusuke Asada as support and later backed-up Gackt, joining his project as the electro-, drum-acoustic- and rhythm guitarist of GacktJOB, from which he first rose to fame in the Japanese music scene.
There are many stories and rumors circulating about the first meeting between Gackt and Masa; a popular story among fans is that Gackt met Masa in New York and wanted to see him play the guitar, but Masa pretended that he couldn't play and watched Gackt's own guitar playing instead.

Masa decided to leave GacktJOB to work on his own career with Spiky, for which he was vocalist and guitarist. During this time Spiky released 2 singles, 6 maxi singles, 1 album and 2 mini albums. However, the project Spiky came to a halt as Masa left in 2005 to start his very own project, Dizzy Drive. The remaining members tried to recruit a new vocalist and the new formation was supposed to debut on the same day as Masa with DIZZY DRIVE, but it never happened. After two final lives in August 2006 Spiky officially announced their disbanding.

In the beginning of June 2006, Masa announced that with the agreement of all members, DIZZY DRIVE would start over with a new concept; since they couldn't identify with their old band name anymore, they also created a new name. The last concert under the name of DIZZY DRIVE was on the second of July. Masa also started to work as a guitarist again, first with the session band JET STREAM ATTACK (covering BUCK-TICK) in June and then on the second Summer Festival, organized by Seventh Heaven with the session band Sin After Sin (covering Luna Sea) in July; he also performed as a singer with Spiky again in August 2006 in two lives, acoustic and electric, which seemed to have been the end of that project. A break was announced until September 2006, after which he returned with his new project, マァマァサ☆ムゥ, which consisted of the same members as DIZZY DRIVE but with the new concept and style. Instead of the more rock attitude of DIZZY DRIVE, their shows are now quite theatrical and the music has a touch of eighties rock. Junn decided to leave the band in January 2007 but due to Masa's nearly fatal road accident, the announcement was postponed until July. From the time of the comeback concert in October 2007 until the final concert in March 2008, Masanori joined the band for support again, but they remained officially only three members.

On the March 16, 2008, マァマァサ☆ムゥ disbanded and Masa announced that he would take a break for the time being. He does not know if he will return as a singer, guitarist, or both, and has not said when he'll return.

Projects
Masa has participated in several projects since his introduction to the Japanese music scene: GacktJOB, Spiky, Dizzy Drive and マァマァサ☆ムゥ

Spiky
Members:
Masa, vocalist/guitarist
dai (Dai Okumura), guitar
KG (Tanabe Keiji), keyboard/producer
Matchy (Matchida Takayuki), bass
Toshi (Toshiyuki Sugino, also former GacktJOB), drums
YAMACHI, guitar
Tomo, bass
Matsukichi, drums

Dizzy Drive
Members:
Masa, vocalist/guitarist
Tak, guitarist(also guitarist for Calmando Qual, an indies band, and Syaranosui)
Junn, bass/guitar
AKITO, drums
Masanori (nori), bass
Their official logo was JETBOY and their official fanclub (shared with Spiky) was known as CHRONICLE.

Discography

Spiky

Albums

Mini-albums

Singles

Dizzy Drive
1st Demo CD(22 May 2005)
(sold at the Kashiwa CLUB ZaX live, limited)
GET NAKED
REAL

2nd Demo CD(15 July 2005)
(sold at the Kumagaya Club Vogue live, limited)
Driving High
サイレン
Curtain Call #1

3rd Demo CD(6 September 2005)
(sold at the Fukuoka DRUM Be-1 live, limited)
Over The Window
[es]

SUPER SONIC(1 March 2006)
Super Sonic
Monster
[es]
Love Tricky
DC ~Destructed Creation~
Driving High

DVDR 1(21 January 2006)
(sold at the Takadanobaba CLUB PHASE Fanclub Event, limited)
Over The Window
REAL

DVD Evolution(14 May 2006)
(sold at the YOKOHAMA CLUB 24 live, limited)
SUPER SONIC
Monster
It's killing me
Love Tricky
[es]
DC
Excuse
Over The Window
Ordinary World
GET NAKED
REAL
AGAINST
スーパーソニック
Driving High
Little by little
Fanclub Event 'Day of Amuse'
スーパーソニック
Photoshooting on the other side of the Camera

Presented CD(August 2005)
(sent to the Fanclub members as a Good-bye-present)
Sign

マァマァサ☆ムゥ
1st Demo CD(2 September 2006)
(sold at the Roppongi Morph Tokyo live, limited)
僕のエンジェル

2nd Demo CD(30 September 2006)
(sold at the Yokohama Soundhall live, limited)
不埒なプラチナ

3rd Demo CD(20 October 2006)
(sold at the Takadanobaba AREA live, limited)
恋はデンジェラス

4th Demo CD(22 November 2006)
(sold at the Shinjuku LOFT live, limited)
危険なふたり (Cover-version)

5th Demo CD(2 December 2006)
(sold at the Kashiwa ZAX live, limited)
情熱パール

6th Demo CD(10 December 2006)
(sold at the Yokohama CLUB 24 live, limited)
またたく夜空、今は幻

7th Demo CD(29 December 2006)
(sold at the Roppongi morph-tokyo live, limited)
7 Colors

8th Demo CD(6 October 2007)
(sold at the Roppongi morph-tokyo live, limited)
Opening
恋はデンジェラス
不埒なプラチナ
僕のエンジェル
Ending

DVD-R(6 October 2007)
(sold at the Roppongi morph-tokyo live, limited)
PV of 不埒なプラチナ

9th Demo CD(4 November 2007)
(sold at the Ueno SENSATION live, limited)
神様 Loving You

10th Demo CD(2 December 2007)
(sold at the Shibuya GUILTY live, limited)
Rhapsody

11th Demo CD(27 December 2007)
(sold at the Ueno SENSATION live, limited)
星屑の舞踏会

12th Demo CD(26 January 2008)
(sold at the Ueno SENSATION live, limited)
Excuse

13th Demo CD(24 February 2008)
(sold at the Ueno SENSATION live, limited)
ひとりじめ

14th Demo CD(16 March 2008)
(sold at the Roppongi morph-tokyo live, limited)
Love Tricky (マァマァサ☆ムゥ Ver.)

Dear.Angel(16 March 2008)
(sold at the Roppongi morph-tokyo live, limited, マァマァサ☆ムゥBest)
OPENING
Excuse
Rhapsody
情熱パール
危険なふたり
ブルーライト
不埒なプラチナ
恋はデンジェラス
神様 Loving You
星屑の舞踏会
僕のエンジェル
7 Colors
ひとりじめ
Ending

External links

Official
マァマァサ☆ムゥ official web site
Seventh Heaven

Unofficial
masa fan-site (it's back up and running)
masa Interview

Japanese rock musicians
Year of birth missing (living people)
Living people
Vocaloid musicians